Lisa Anne Barnett (August 24, 1958 – May 2, 2006) was an American Lambda Literary Award winning science fiction writer.

Early life 
Barnett was born and raised in Dorchester, Boston, where she attended Girls' Latin School (now Boston Latin Academy). She had two sisters and a brother. She graduated from the University of Massachusetts Boston with a bachelor's degree in English, and was a member of the Piscataqua Obedience Club, a volunteer with EPONA (Equine Protection of North America) and senior editor at Heinemann in Portsmouth, New Hampshire. She worked at Baker's Plays before being hired as an editor at Heinemann Publishing in 1988.

Personal life
Barnett lived in Portsmouth, New Hampshire, with her partner of more than two decades, author Melissa Scott.

Death 
Barnett died from breast and brain cancer on May 2, 2006 in Lynn, Massachusetts.

Works
All co-authored with Melissa Scott:

Novels
 
 
  2001 winner of the Lambda Literary Award for science fiction, fantasy and horror

Short fiction
The Carmen Miranda Gambit (1990)

References

External links

1958 births
2006 deaths
20th-century American novelists
21st-century American novelists
American fantasy writers
American women short story writers
American women novelists
Deaths from brain cancer in the United States
Deaths from breast cancer
Lambda Literary Award winners
American lesbian writers
American LGBT novelists
LGBT people from Massachusetts
Writers from Portsmouth, New Hampshire
Writers from Boston
Novelists from New Hampshire
Science fiction editors
University of Massachusetts Boston alumni
Women science fiction and fantasy writers
20th-century American women writers
21st-century American women writers
American science fiction writers
20th-century American short story writers
21st-century American short story writers
Novelists from Massachusetts
People from Dorchester, Massachusetts
20th-century American LGBT people
Boston Latin Academy alumni